Canada Hill, Nova Scotia  is a community of the Municipality of the District of Shelburne in the Canadian province of Nova Scotia.

General Service Areas in Nova Scotia
Communities in Shelburne County, Nova Scotia